Willard Earl Donovan (July 6, 1916 – September 25, 1997) was an American baseball player who was a pitcher in Major League Baseball in 1942 and 1943 for the Boston Braves. He was born in Maywood, Illinois.

Over two seasons, Donovan posted a 4–6 record with 23 strikeouts and a 3.20 ERA in 38 appearances, including 10 starts, two complete games, and 104 innings pitched.

From 1943 to 1945, Donovan served in the military during World War II.

Donovan died in his homeland of Maywood, Illinois, at the age of 81.

References

External links

Major League Baseball pitchers
Boston Braves players
Reidsville Luckies players
Portsmouth Cubs players
Mount Airy Graniteers players
Tarboro Serpents players
Charleston Senators players
Hartford Bees players
Evansville Bees players
Baseball players from Illinois
Sportspeople from Maywood, Illinois
United States Navy personnel of World War II
1916 births
1997 deaths